Everything Remains (As It Never Was) is the fourth studio album by Swiss folk metal band Eluveitie. The album was produced by Colin Richardson, and released on 19 February 2010 through Nuclear Blast.

The album spawned one single, "Thousandfold", which has gained over 14,600,000 views on YouTube.

Sound

Unlike Eluveitie's previous release Evocation I: The Arcane Dominion which was primarily a folk rock/acoustic folk album, Everything Remains returns to the band's roots and is a straight folk metal album.

Reception

Everything Remains generally received highly positive reviews. Pascal Stieler, writing for Metal1.info wrote that Everything Remains was "in all matters outstanding, varied album that simply has no weaknesses" and gave the album 9/10. Metal.de also gave the album 9/10.

The fanbase's reaction was generally positive, with songs like Thousandfold being played frequently on tour.

Track listing

Credits
 Chrigel Glanzmann - vocals, acoustic guitars, mandolin, uilleann pipes, bodhràn, tin and low whistles, gaita
 Anna Murphy – hurdy gurdy, flute, vocals
 Meri Tadić – violin, vocals
 Päde Kistler – bagpipes, tin and low whistles
 Kay Brem – bass
 Merlin Sutter – drums
 Sime Koch – guitars
 Ivo Henzi – guitars
 Torbjörn "Thebon" Schei - additional vocals on "(Do)minion"
 Brendan Wade - uilleann pipes on "Otherworld", "Setlon" and "The Liminal Passage"
 Dannii Young - spoken voice on "Otherworld" and "The Liminal Passage"
 Arranged by Eluveitie
 Drums, guitars (electric and acoustic), bass and vocals were recorded at Newsound Studio, Pfäffikon SZ, Switzerland. These recordings were engineered by Tommy Vetterli.
 Fiddle and hurdy gurdy were recorded at Devil's Studios, Vaduz/Liechtenstein. These recordings were engineered by Ivo Henzi and Olli Frank-Zambelli. Fiddle was engineered by Freddy Schnyder.
 Bagpipes, whistles, uilleann pipes, mandola, mandolin and bodhrán were recorded at C Studio, Switzerland. These recordings were engineered by Chrigel Glanzmann. Microphones by Ballhorn Studios, Winterhur, Switzerland.
 Mixed by Colin Richardson and Martin "Ginge" Ford for Real Productions and Management at Not-In-Pill Studios, Newport, Wales
 Mastered by John Davis
 Produced by Eluveitie and Tommy Vetterli.

Chart performance

References

External links
"Thousandfold" music video

2010 albums
Eluveitie albums
Nuclear Blast albums
Albums with cover art by Travis Smith (artist)